Legacy of a Quiet Man is a music album by Irish singer Sinead Stone and musician Gerard Farrelly. The album was released in 2001 on the Seolta Records label and is a collection of songs written by Gerard’s father Dick Farrelly. Dick is best remembered for his composition, The Isle of Innisfree which became a worldwide hit for Bing Crosby and was used as the theme music of the film, The Quiet Man, starring John Wayne and Maureen O'Hara.

The album features some of Farrelly's best known songs along with songs recorded here for the first time; they include two songs written in Irish, "Siobhán" and "Seolta Bána".

The album’s musical style is Celtic / Folk / Irish

Track listing
"Seolta Bána" – 3:21
"Isle of Innisfree"   – 3:53
"Annaghdown" – 3:25
"People like You and Me" – 2:36
"If You Ever Fall in Love Again"   – 2:55
"When Today is Yesterday" – 3:21
"Shores of Loch Leven" – 3:05
"We Dreamed our Dreams" – 4:43
"Cottage by the Lee"   – 3:21
"The Gypsy Maiden" – 3:24
"Black is the Colour" (Bonus track) – 4:02
"Siobhán" – 3:23

Personnel
 Sinead Stone – Vocals
 Gerard Farrelly – Piano, Rhodes Piano, Keyboards & Percussion
 Mick McCarney – Acoustic Guitar
 Richard M.Farrelly – Acoustic Guitar
 Brendan Monaghan – Uilleann pipes, Whistle & Bodhrán
 Colum Sands – Acoustic Guitar
 Shaun Sweeney – Accordion

Production
 Producers: Sinead Stone & Gerard Farrelly
 Engineer: Billy Robinson
 Recorded at: Sinead and Gerard’s home in Dublin and in Billy’s home in Ramelton, Donegal
 "The Gypsy Maiden" recorded at Spring Recording Studios, Co Down, engineered by Colum Sands
 Concept / Design & Layout: Gerard Farrelly & Sinead Stone

References
 Des MacHale's book, "Picture The Quiet Man" - Appletree Press (2004)
 IMRO - Irish Music Rights Organisation
 Musician Gerard Farrelly's site

External links
 Irish Music Rights Organisation - article
 Dick Farrelly & 'Legacy of a Quiet Man' album
 legacy Tara Music - Legacy of a Quiet Man

Celtic albums by Irish artists
2001 albums